The 1982 NHK Trophy was held in Tokyo. Medals were awarded in the disciplines of men's singles, ladies' singles, pair skating, and ice dancing.

Results

Men

Ladies

Pairs

Ice dancing

External links
 1982 NHK Trophy

Nhk Trophy, 1982
NHK Trophy